Anthony Lewis Amonte (born August 2, 1970) is an American former professional ice hockey player.  He played right wing over 17 seasons in the National Hockey League (NHL) for the New York Rangers, Chicago Blackhawks, Phoenix Coyotes, Philadelphia Flyers and the Calgary Flames. He previously served as the head coach of the Thayer Academy men's varsity hockey team. He is currently a scout with the Florida Panthers.

Playing career

Drafted 68th overall in the 1988 NHL Entry Draft by the New York Rangers, Amonte is best known for his time as a scoring star with the Chicago Blackhawks and for representing the United States in international play. Amonte made his debut in the 1991 playoffs. He impressed as a rookie, scoring over 30 goals and placing third in the balloting for the Calder Memorial Trophy. He played three seasons with the Rangers, scoring 84 goals, before being traded to the Chicago Blackhawks with seven games to go in the 1993–94 season, the year the Rangers went on to win the Stanley Cup. He gained stardom in Chicago where he was initially reunited with former Thayer Academy teammate Jeremy Roenick, scoring at least 30 goals six times and at least 40 three times, including having a five-season-long streak in which he did not miss a single game.

Amonte, playing for Team USA, won the Gold Medal in the 1996 World Cup of Hockey tournament. Amonte scored the game-winning goal with just two and a half minutes left in the final against Team Canada.

He began the 2002–03 season with the Phoenix Coyotes and was traded to the Philadelphia Flyers near the end of the season. Amonte signed with the Calgary Flames as a free agent on August 2, 2005, and scored his 400th NHL goal for the Flames on December 10, 2005, against the Ottawa Senators.

As of March 2020, he is ranked 13th all-time in points among American-born players, with 900. 

He announced his retirement via his personal website in 2008.

On January 21, 2009, the Chicago Blackhawks celebrated "Tony Amonte Heritage Night" at the United Center. They awarded the first 10,000 fans with special commemorative Tony Amonte pins.

Transactions
New York Rangers' 4th round draft choice in the 1988 NHL Entry Draft.
March 21, 1994 - Traded by the New York Rangers, along with Matt Oates, to the Chicago Blackhawks in exchange for Stéphane Matteau and Brian Noonan.
July 12, 2002 - Signed as a free agent with the Phoenix Coyotes.
March 10, 2003 - Traded by the Phoenix Coyotes to the Philadelphia Flyers in exchange for Guillaume Lefebvre, Atlanta's 2003 3rd round draft choice, and Phoenix's 2004 2nd round draft choice.
August 2, 2005 - Signed as a free agent with the Calgary Flames.

Awards and honors

NHL All-Rookie Team - 1992
Played in five NHL All-Star Games - 1997, 1998, 1999, 2000, 2001

Career statistics

Regular season and playoffs

International

International play
Played for the United States in:
World Junior Championships – 1989, 1990
World Championships - 1991, 1993
1996 World Cup of Hockey - 1996 (gold medal)
Winter Olympic Games - 1998, 2002 (silver medal)

Coaching career
On June 11, 2010, Tony was named the new head coach of the hockey program at his alma mater, Thayer Academy in Braintree, Massachusetts. On September 27, 2022, it was announced that Tony Amonte would step down as head coach of the Thayer Academy men's varsity hockey team. He stepped down in order to join the Florida Panthers as a scout.

Family

Amonte is married with four children.

Amonte's sister is Kelly Amonte Hiller, head coach of women's lacrosse at Northwestern University.  Hiller has guided the team to seven National Titles.
Hiller was also a four-time All-American at the  University of Maryland, College Park and two-time NCAA Division 1 Player of the Year in 1995 and 1996.

Amonte is the cousin of NHL player Charlie Coyle, who currently plays for the Boston Bruins.

See also
List of NHL players with 1,000 games played

References

External links

 

1970 births
American men's ice hockey right wingers
Boston University Terriers men's ice hockey players
Calgary Flames players
Chicago Blackhawks captains
Chicago Blackhawks players
Ice hockey players from Massachusetts
Ice hockey players at the 1998 Winter Olympics
Ice hockey players at the 2002 Winter Olympics
Living people
Medalists at the 2002 Winter Olympics
New York Rangers draft picks
New York Rangers players
Olympic silver medalists for the United States in ice hockey
People from Hingham, Massachusetts
Philadelphia Flyers players
Phoenix Coyotes players
Sportspeople from Plymouth County, Massachusetts
United States Hockey Hall of Fame inductees